Soapbox Heroes is Enter the Haggis's 5th album.  It was released on July 18, 2006.  Soapbox Heroes is the second album on their current label, UFO Music (United for Opportunity), and was produced by Neil Dorfsman. It was widely greeted by fans and goes mostly under the genre of Celtic Rock.

The album was recorded at The Clubhouse Studio in Rhinebeck, NY and mixed at Saint Claire Recording Company in Lexington, KY.

Track listing
1. Lancaster Gate
2. One Last Drink
3. New Monthly Flavour
4. The Apothecary
5. Cynical
6. The Barfly
7. No More Stones
8. Perfect Song
9. Marti's Last Stand
10. Long Way Home

Personnel
Enter The Haggis
Mark Abraham - Bass, Mandolin, and Backing Vocals
Brian Buchanan - Vocals, Fiddles, Piano, B-3, Synthesizer, Wurlitzer, Electric Guitar, and Acoustic Guitar
James Campbell - Drums, and Percussion
Craig Downie - Lead Vocals on "Marti's Last Stand", Backing Vocals, Highland Bagpipes, Electronic Redpipes, Tin Whistles, and Harmonicas
Trevor Lewington - Vocals, Lead Electric Guitar, and Acoustic Guitar

Additional Musicians
Anthony Giles - Tabla Drums, Timbales, and Conga Drums
Rob Turner - Cello on "The Barfly"

2006 albums
Enter the Haggis albums